Perrins may refer to:

Charles William Dyson Perrins (1864–1958), English businessman, bibliophile and philanthropist
Chris Perrins, LVO, FRS (born 1935), British biologist
George Perrins (1873 – unknown) was an English footballer
Isaac Perrins, English bareknuckle prizefighter and 18th-century engineer
Leslie Perrins (1901–1962), English actor who often played villains
Wesley Perrins, MBE (1905–1990), English trade unionist and Labour Party politician from Stourbridge
William Henry Perrins (1793–1867), drug-store chemist who formed a partnership in 1823 with John Wheeley Lea

See also
Dyson Perrins CofE Academy,  co-educational secondary school with academy status in Malvern, Worcestershire, England
Dyson Perrins Laboratory, organic chemistry research laboratory in the University of Oxford, 1916–2003
Perrins Corners, Ontario in eastern Ontario, Canada
Lea & Perrins, United Kingdom based food division of the H.J. Heinz Company, originating in Worcester, England
Perrin (disambiguation)